This Woman is the seventh studio album by LeAnn Rimes, released on January 25, 2005. While promoting This Woman, she stated that it was her return to her "roots", country music. The album has a theme of falling in love and marriage. It was a success on the country charts. Rimes co-wrote three tracks on the album: "You Take Me Home", "I Got It Bad" and "When This Woman Loves a Man".

Singles from the album include, in order of release, "Nothin' 'bout Love Makes Sense", "Probably Wouldn't Be This Way", "Something's Gotta Give" and "Some People". Respectively, these reached #5, #3, #2, and #36 on the country singles charts.

A bonus thirteenth track, "Afraid to Fall", was released exclusively to US Target stores. It was also included as a bonus track on the Japanese version of the album. Rimes helped pen this track as well.

Track listing

Personnel
Credits for This Woman were adapted from liner notes.

 Tim Akers – keyboards, accordion
 Adam Ayan – mastering on "Afraid to Fall" and "Probably Wouldn't Be This Way"
 Robert Bailey – background vocals
 Jeff Balding – mixing on "Afraid to Fall" and "Probably Wouldn't Be This Way"
 Brady Barnett – recording
 Drew Bollman – assistant mixing
 Bruce Bouton – Dobro
 Bekka Bramlett – background vocals
 Mike Brignardello – bass guitar
 David Bryant – assistant recording
 Tom Bukovac – electric guitar
 Lisa Cochran – background vocals
 Vinnie Colaiuta – drums
 Perry Coleman – background vocals
 J. T. Corenflos – electric guitar
 Eric Darken – percussion
 Dan Dugmore – steel guitar
 Shannon Forrest – drums
 Ben Fowler – recording
 Paul Franklin – steel guitar
 Mike "Frog" Griffith – production coordinator on "Afraid to Fall" and "Probably Wouldn't Be This Way"
 Tod Gunnerson – assistant recording
 Jed Hackett – recording
 Mark Hagen – recording
 Vicki Hampton – background vocals
 Dann Huff – electric guitar, acoustic guitar, producer
 Joanna Janét – background vocals
 Jay Joyce – electric guitar
 Charlie Judge – keyboards
 Scott Kidd – assistant mixing
 Greg Lawrence – assistant recording
 B. James Lowry – acoustic guitar
 Chris McHugh – drums
 Steve Nathan – keyboards
 Justin Niebank – mixing
 LeAnn Rimes – lead vocals
 Christopher Rowe – digital editing on "Afraid to Fall" and "Probably Wouldn't Be This Way"
 Jimmie Lee Sloas – bass guitar
 Russell Terrell – background vocals
 Dan Tyminski – background vocals*
 Keith Urban – electric guitar solo**
 John Willis – acoustic guitar
 Lonnie Wilson – drums
 Glenn Worf – bass guitar
 Jonathan Yudkin – fiddle, mandolin, banjo

*Note: Dan Tyminski appears courtesy of Rounder Records.
**Note: Keith Urban appears courtesy of Capitol Records Nashville.

Charts
This Woman debuted at #3 on the Billboard 200 with over 101,000 copies sold in its 1st week, it fell to #25 with 40,000 copies sold in its 2nd week and #40 in its 3rd week with 37,000 copies sold. The album spent 3 weeks in top 50 and a total of 47 weeks in Billboard 200. It has received gold status and sold over 618,000 copies in United States as of June 2006 by Nielsen SoundScan.

Weekly charts

Year-end chart

Certifications

References 

2005 albums
Asylum-Curb Records albums
LeAnn Rimes albums
Albums produced by Dann Huff